The NIST Dictionary of Algorithms and Data Structures is a reference work maintained by the U.S. National Institute of Standards and Technology. It defines a large number of terms relating to algorithms and data structures. For algorithms and data structures not necessarily mentioned here, see list of algorithms and list of data structures.

This list of terms was originally derived from the index of that document, and is in the public domain, as it was compiled by a Federal Government employee as part of a Federal Government work. Some of the terms defined are:



A 
 absolute performance guarantee
 abstract data type (ADT)
 (a,b)-tree
 accepting state
 Ackermann's function
 active data structure
 acyclic directed graph
 adaptive heap sort
 adaptive Huffman coding
 adaptive k-d tree
 adaptive sort
 address-calculation sort
 adjacency list representation
 adjacency matrix representation
 adversary
 algorithm
 algorithm BSTW
 algorithm FGK
 algorithmic efficiency
 algorithmically solvable
 algorithm V
 all pairs shortest path
 alphabet
 Alpha Skip Search algorithm
 alternating path
 alternating Turing machine
 alternation
 American flag sort
 amortized cost
 ancestor
 and
 American National Standards Institute (ANSI)
 antichain
 antisymmetric relation
 AP
 Apostolico–Crochemore
 Apostolico–Giancarlo algorithm
 approximate string matching
 approximation algorithm
 arborescence
 arithmetic coding
 array
 array index
 array merging
 array search
 articulation point
 A* search algorithm
 assignment problem
 association list
 associative
 associative array
 asymptotically tight bound
 asymptotic bound
 asymptotic lower bound
 asymptotic space complexity
 asymptotic time complexity
 asymptotic upper bound
 augmenting path
 automaton
 average case
 average-case cost
 AVL tree
 axiomatic semantics

B 
 backtracking
 bag
 Baillie–PSW primality test
 balanced binary search tree
 balanced binary tree
 balanced k-way merge sort
 balanced merge sort
 balanced multiway merge
 balanced multiway tree
 balanced quicksort
 balanced tree
 balanced two-way merge sort
 BANG file
 Batcher sort
 Baum Welch algorithm
 BB α tree
 BDD
 BD-tree
 Bellman–Ford algorithm
 Benford's law
 best case
 best-case cost
 best-first search
 biconnected component
 biconnected graph
 bidirectional bubble sort
 big-O notation
 binary function
 binary fuse filter
 binary GCD algorithm
 binary heap
 binary insertion sort
 binary knapsack problem
 binary priority queue
 binary relation
 binary search
 binary search tree
 binary tree
 binary tree representation of trees
 bingo sort
 binomial heap
 binomial tree
 bin packing problem
 bin sort
 bintree
 bipartite graph
 bipartite matching
 bisector
 bitonic sort
 bit vector
 Bk tree
 bdk tree (not to be confused with k-d-B-tree)
 block
 block addressing index
 blocking flow
 block search
 Bloom filter
 blossom (graph theory)
 bogosort
 boogol
 boolean
 boolean expression
 boolean function
 bottleneck traveling salesman
 bottom-up tree automaton
 boundary-based representation
 bounded error probability in polynomial time
 bounded queue
 bounded stack
 Bounding volume hierarchy, also referred to as bounding volume tree (BV-tree, BVT)
 Boyer–Moore string-search algorithm
 Boyer–Moore–Horspool algorithm
 bozo sort
 B+ tree
 BPP (complexity)
 Bradford's law
 branch (as in control flow)
 branch (as in revision control)
 branch and bound
 breadth-first search
 Bresenham's line algorithm
 brick sort
 bridge
 British Museum algorithm
 brute-force attack
 brute-force search
 brute-force string search
 brute-force string search with mismatches
 BSP-tree
 B*-tree
 B-tree
 bubble sort
 bucket
 bucket array
 bucketing method
 bucket sort
 bucket trie
 buddy system
 buddy tree
 build-heap
 Burrows–Wheeler transform (BWT)
 busy beaver
 Byzantine generals

C 
 cactus stack
 Calculus of Communicating Systems (CCS)
 calendar queue
 candidate consistency testing
 candidate verification
 canonical complexity class
 capacitated facility location
 capacity
 capacity constraint
 Cartesian tree
 cascade merge sort
 caverphone
 Cayley–Purser algorithm
 C curve
 cell probe model
 cell tree
 cellular automaton
 centroid
 certificate
 chain (order theory)
 chaining (algorithm)
 child
 Chinese postman problem
 Chinese remainder theorem
 Christofides algorithm
 Christofides heuristic
 chromatic index
 chromatic number
 Church–Turing thesis
 circuit
 circuit complexity
 circuit value problem
 circular list
 circular queue
 clique
 clique problem
 clustering (see hash table)
 clustering free
 coalesced hashing
 coarsening
 cocktail shaker sort
 codeword
 coding tree
 collective recursion
 collision
 collision resolution scheme
 Colussi
 combination
 comb sort
 Communicating Sequential Processes
 commutative
 compact DAWG
 compact trie
 comparison sort
 competitive analysis
 competitive ratio
 complement
 complete binary tree
 complete graph
 completely connected graph
 complete tree
 complexity
 complexity class
 computable
 concave function
 concurrent flow
 concurrent read, concurrent write
 concurrent read, exclusive write
 configuration
 confluently persistent data structure
 conjunction
 connected components
 connected graph
 co-NP
 constant function
 continuous knapsack problem
 Cook reduction
 Cook's theorem
 counting sort
 covering
 CRCW
 Crew (algorithm)
 critical path problem
 CSP (communicating sequential processes)
 CSP (constraint satisfaction problem)
 CTL
 cuckoo hashing
 cuckoo filter
 cut (graph theory)
 cut (logic programming)
 cutting plane
 cutting stock problem
 cutting theorem
 cut vertex
 cycle sort
 cyclic redundancy check (CRC)

D 
 D-adjacent
 DAG shortest paths
 Damerau–Levenshtein distance
 data structure
 decidable
 decidable language
 decimation
 decision problem
 decision tree
 decomposable searching problem
 degree
 dense graph
 depoissonization
 depth
 depth-first search (DFS)
 deque
 derangement
 descendant (see tree structure)
 deterministic
 deterministic algorithm
 deterministic finite automata string search
 deterministic finite automaton (DFA)
 deterministic finite state machine
 deterministic finite tree automaton
 deterministic pushdown automaton (DPDA)
 deterministic tree automaton
 Deutsch–Jozsa algorithm
 DFS forest
 DFTA
 diagonalization argument
 diameter
 dichotomic search
 dictionary (data structure)
 diet (see discrete interval encoding tree below)
 difference (set theory)
 digital search tree
 digital tree
 digraph
 Dijkstra's algorithm
 diminishing increment sort
 dining philosophers
 direct chaining hashing
 directed acyclic graph (DAG)
 directed acyclic word graph (DAWG)
 directed graph
 discrete interval encoding tree
 discrete p-center
 disjoint set
 disjunction
 distributed algorithm
 distributional complexity
 distribution sort
 divide-and-conquer algorithm
 divide and marriage before conquest
 division method
 data domain
 don't-care term
 Doomsday rule
 double-direction bubble sort
 double-ended priority queue
 double hashing
 double left rotation
 Double Metaphone
 double right rotation
 double-ended queue
 doubly linked list
 dragon curve
 dual graph
 dual linear program
 dyadic tree
 dynamic array
 dynamic data structure
 dynamic hashing
 dynamic programming
 dynamization transformation

E 
 edge
 eb tree (elastic binary tree)
 edge coloring
 edge connectivity
 edge crossing
 edge-weighted graph
 edit distance
 edit operation
 edit script
 8 queens
 elastic-bucket trie
 element uniqueness
 end-of-string
 epidemic algorithm
 Euclidean algorithm
 Euclidean distance
 Euclidean Steiner tree
 Euclidean traveling salesman problem
 Euclid's algorithm
 Euler cycle
 Eulerian graph
 Eulerian path
 exact string matching
 EXCELL (extendible cell)
 exchange sort
 exclusive or
 exclusive read, concurrent write (ERCW)
 exclusive read, exclusive write (EREW)
 exhaustive search
 existential state
 expandable hashing
 expander graph
 exponential
 extended binary tree
 extended Euclidean algorithm
 extended k-d tree
 extendible hashing
 external index
 external memory algorithm
 external memory data structure
 external merge
 external merge sort
 external node
 external quicksort
 external radix sort
 external sort
 extrapolation search
 extremal
 extreme point

F 
 facility location
 factor (see substring)
 factorial
 fast fourier transform (FFT)
 fathoming
 feasible region
 feasible solution
 feedback edge set
 feedback vertex set
 Ferguson–Forcade algorithm
 Fibonacci number
 Fibonacci search
 Fibonacci tree
 Fibonacci heap
 Find
 find kth least element
 finitary tree
 finite Fourier transform (discrete Fourier transform)
 finite state automaton
 finite-state machine
 finite state machine minimization
 finite-state transducer
 first come, first served
 first-in, first-out (FIFO)
 fixed-grid method
 flash sort
 flow
 flow conservation
 flow function
 flow network
 Floyd–Warshall algorithm
 Ford–Bellman algorithm
 Ford–Fulkerson algorithm
 forest
 forest editing problem
 formal language
 formal methods
 formal verification
 forward index
 fractal
 fractional knapsack problem
 fractional solution
 free edge
 free list
 free tree
 free vertex
 frequency count heuristic
 full array
 full binary tree
 full inverted index
 fully dynamic graph problem
 fully persistent data structure
 fully polynomial approximation scheme
 function (programming)
 function (mathematics)
 functional data structure

G 
 Galil–Giancarlo
 Galil–Seiferas
 gamma function
 GBD-tree
 geometric optimization problem
 global optimum
 gnome sort
 goobi
 graph
 graph coloring
 graph concentration
 graph drawing
 graph isomorphism
 graph partition
 Gray code
 greatest common divisor (GCD)
 greedy algorithm
 greedy heuristic
 grid drawing
 grid file
 Grover's algorithm

H 
 halting problem
 Hamiltonian cycle
 Hamiltonian path
 Hamming distance
 Harter–Highway dragon
 hash function
 hash heap
 hash table
 hash table delete
 Hausdorff distance
 hB-tree
 head
 heap
 heapify
 heap property
 heapsort
 heaviest common subsequence
 height
 height-balanced binary search tree
 height-balanced tree
 heuristic
 hidden Markov model
 highest common factor
 Hilbert curve
 histogram sort
 homeomorphic
 horizontal visibility map
 Huffman encoding
 Hungarian algorithm
 hybrid algorithm
 hyperedge
 hypergraph

I 
 Identity function
 ideal merge
 implication
 implies
 implicit data structure
 in-branching
 inclusion–exclusion principle
 inclusive or
 incompressible string
 incremental algorithm
 in-degree
 independent set (graph theory)
 index file
 information theoretic bound
 in-place algorithm
 in-order traversal
 in-place sort
 insertion sort
 instantaneous description
 integer linear program
 integer multi-commodity flow
 integer polyhedron
 interactive proof system
 interface
 interior-based representation
 internal node
 internal sort
 interpolation search
 interpolation-sequential search
 interpolation sort
 intersection (set theory)
 interval tree
 intractable
 introsort
 introspective sort
 inverse Ackermann function
 inverted file index
 inverted index
 irreflexive
 isomorphic
 iteration

J 
 Jaro–Winkler distance
 Johnson's algorithm
 Johnson–Trotter algorithm
 jump list
 jump search

K 
 Karmarkar's algorithm
 Karnaugh map
 Karp–Rabin string-search algorithm
 Karp reduction
 k-ary heap
 k-ary Huffman encoding
 k-ary tree
 k-clustering
 k-coloring
 k-connected graph
 k-d-B-tree (not to be confused with bdk tree)
 k-dimensional
 K-dominant match
 k-d tree
 key
 KMP
 KmpSkip Search
 knapsack problem
 knight's tour
 Knuth–Morris–Pratt algorithm
 Königsberg bridges problem
 Kolmogorov complexity
 Kraft's inequality
 Kripke structure
 Kruskal's algorithm
 kth order Fibonacci numbers
 kth shortest path
 kth smallest element
 KV diagram
 k-way merge
 k-way merge sort
 k-way tree

L 
 labeled graph
 language
 last-in, first-out (LIFO)
 Las Vegas algorithm
 lattice (group)
 layered graph
 LCS
 leaf
 least common multiple (LCM)
 leftist tree
 left rotation
 left-child right-sibling binary tree also termed first-child next-sibling binary tree, doubly chained tree, or filial-heir chain
 Lempel–Ziv–Welch (LZW)
 level-order traversal
 Levenshtein distance
 lexicographical order
 linear
 linear congruential generator
 linear hash
 linear insertion sort
 linear order
 linear probing
 linear probing sort
 linear product
 linear program
 linear quadtree
 linear search
 link
 linked list
 list
 list contraction
 little-o notation
 Lm distance
 load factor (computer science)
 local alignment
 local optimum
 logarithm, logarithmic scale
 longest common subsequence
 longest common substring
 Lotka's law
 lower bound
 lower triangular matrix
 lowest common ancestor
 l-reduction

M 
 Malhotra–Kumar–Maheshwari blocking flow (ru.)
 Manhattan distance
 many-one reduction
 Markov chain
 marriage problem (see assignment problem)
 Master theorem (analysis of algorithms)
 matched edge
 matched vertex
 matching (graph theory)
 matrix
 matrix-chain multiplication problem
 max-heap property
 maximal independent set
 maximally connected component
 Maximal Shift
 maximum bipartite matching
 maximum-flow problem
 MAX-SNP
 Mealy machine
 mean
 median
 meld (data structures)
 memoization
 merge algorithm
 merge sort
 Merkle tree
 meromorphic function
 metaheuristic
 metaphone
 midrange
 Miller–Rabin primality test
 min-heap property
 minimal perfect hashing
 minimum bounding box (MBB)
 minimum cut
 minimum path cover
 minimum spanning tree
 minimum vertex cut
 mixed integer linear program
 mode
 model checking
 model of computation
 moderately exponential
 MODIFIND
 monotone priority queue
 monotonically decreasing
 monotonically increasing
 Monte Carlo algorithm
 Moore machine
 Morris–Pratt
 move (finite-state machine transition)
 move-to-front heuristic
 move-to-root heuristic
 multi-commodity flow
 multigraph
 multilayer grid file
 multiplication method
 multiprefix
 multiprocessor model
 multiset
 multi suffix tree
 multiway decision
 multiway merge
 multiway search tree
 multiway tree
 Munkres' assignment algorithm

N 
 naive string search
 nand
 n-ary function
 NC
 NC many-one reducibility
 nearest neighbor search
 negation
 network flow (see flow network)
 network flow problem
 next state
 NIST
 node
 nonbalanced merge
 nonbalanced merge sort
 nondeterministic
 nondeterministic algorithm
 nondeterministic finite automaton
 nondeterministic finite-state machine (NFA)
 nondeterministic finite tree automaton (NFTA)
 nondeterministic polynomial time
 nondeterministic tree automaton
 nondeterministic Turing machine
 nonterminal node
 nor
 not
 Not So Naive
 NP
 NP-complete
 NP-complete language
 NP-hard
 n queens
 nullary function
 null tree
 New York State Identification and Intelligence System (NYSIIS)

O 
 objective function
 occurrence
 octree
 odd–even sort
 offline algorithm
 offset (computer science)
 omega
 omicron
 one-based indexing
 one-dimensional
 online algorithm
 open addressing
 optimal
 optimal cost
 optimal hashing
 optimal merge
 optimal mismatch
 optimal polygon triangulation problem
 optimal polyphase merge
 optimal polyphase merge sort
 optimal solution
 optimal triangulation problem
 optimal value
 optimization problem
 or
 oracle set
 oracle tape
 oracle Turing machine
 orders of approximation
 ordered array
 ordered binary decision diagram (OBDD)
 ordered linked list
 ordered tree
 order preserving hash
 order preserving minimal perfect hashing
 oriented acyclic graph
 oriented graph
 oriented tree
 orthogonal drawing
 orthogonal lists
 orthogonally convex rectilinear polygon
 oscillating merge sort
 out-branching
 out-degree
 overlapping subproblems

P 
 packing (see set packing)
 padding argument
 pagoda
 pairing heap
 PAM (point access method)
 parallel computation thesis
 parallel prefix computation
 parallel random-access machine (PRAM)
 parametric searching
 parent
 partial function
 partially decidable problem
 partially dynamic graph problem
 partially ordered set
 partially persistent data structure
 partial order
 partial recursive function
 partition (set theory)
 passive data structure
 patience sorting
 path (graph theory)
 path cover
 path system problem
 Patricia tree
 pattern
 pattern element
 P-complete
 PCP
 Peano curve
 Pearson's hashing
 perfect binary tree
 perfect hashing
 perfect k-ary tree
 perfect matching
 perfect shuffle
 performance guarantee
 performance ratio
 permutation
 persistent data structure
 phonetic coding
 pile (data structure)
 pipelined divide and conquer
 planar graph
 planarization
 planar straight-line graph
 PLOP-hashing
 point access method
 pointer jumping
 pointer machine
 poissonization
 polychotomy
 polyhedron
 polylogarithmic
 polynomial
 polynomial-time approximation scheme (PTAS)
 polynomial hierarchy
 polynomial time
 polynomial-time Church–Turing thesis
 polynomial-time reduction
 polyphase merge
 polyphase merge sort
 polytope
 poset
 postfix traversal
 Post machine (see Post–Turing machine)
 postman's sort
 postorder traversal
 Post correspondence problem
 potential function (see potential method)
 predicate
 prefix
 prefix code
 prefix computation
 prefix sum
 prefix traversal
 preorder traversal
 primary clustering
 primitive recursive
 Prim's algorithm
 principle of optimality
 priority queue
 prisoner's dilemma
 PRNG
 probabilistic algorithm
 probabilistically checkable proof
 probabilistic Turing machine
 probe sequence
 Procedure (computer science)
 process algebra
 proper (see proper subset)
 proper binary tree
 proper coloring
 proper subset
 property list
 prune and search
 pseudorandom number generator
 pth order Fibonacci numbers
 P-tree
 purely functional language
 pushdown automaton (PDA)
 pushdown transducer
 p-way merge sort

Q 
 qm sort
 qsort
 quadratic probing
 quadtree
 quadtree complexity theorem
 quad trie
 quantum computation
 queue
 quicksort

R 
 Rabin–Karp string-search algorithm
 radix quicksort
 radix sort
 ragged matrix
 Raita algorithm
 random-access machine
 random number generation
 randomization
 randomized algorithm
 randomized binary search tree
 randomized complexity
 randomized polynomial time
 randomized rounding
 randomized search tree
 Randomized-Select
 random number generator
 random sampling
 range (function)
 range sort
 Rank (graph theory)
 Ratcliff/Obershelp pattern recognition
 reachable
 rebalance
 recognizer
 rectangular matrix
  rectilinear
 rectilinear Steiner tree
 recurrence equations
 recurrence relation
 recursion
 recursion termination
 recursion tree
 recursive (computer science)
 recursive data structure
 recursive doubling
 recursive language
 recursively enumerable language
 recursively solvable
 red–black tree
 reduced basis
 reduced digraph
 reduced ordered binary decision diagram (ROBDD)
 reduction
 reflexive relation
 regular decomposition
 rehashing
 relation (mathematics)
 relational structure
 relative performance guarantee
 relaxation
 relaxed balance
 rescalable
 restricted universe sort
 result cache
 Reverse Colussi
 Reverse Factor
 R-file
 Rice's method
 right rotation
 right-threaded tree
 root
 root balance
 rooted tree
 rotate left
 rotate right
 rotation
 rough graph
 RP
 R+-tree
 R*-tree
 R-tree
 run time

S 
 saguaro stack
 saturated edge
 SBB tree
 scan
 scapegoat tree
 search algorithm
 search tree
 search tree property
 secant search
 secondary clustering
 memory segment
 select algorithm
 select and partition
 selection problem
 selection sort
 select kth element
 select mode
 self-loop
 self-organizing heuristic
 self-organizing list
 self-organizing sequential search
 semidefinite programming
 separate chaining hashing
 separator theorem
 sequential search
 set
 set cover
 set packing
 shadow heap
 shadow merge
 shadow merge insert
 shaker sort
 Shannon–Fano coding
 shared memory
 Shell sort
 Shift-Or
 Shor's algorithm
 shortcutting
 shortest common supersequence
 shortest common superstring
 shortest path
 shortest spanning tree
 shuffle
 shuffle sort
 sibling
 Sierpiński curve
 Sierpinski triangle
 sieve of Eratosthenes
 sift up
 signature
 Simon's algorithm
 simple merge
 simple path
 simple uniform hashing
 simplex communication
 simulated annealing
 simulation theorem
 single-destination shortest-path problem
 single-pair shortest-path problem
 single program multiple data
 single-source shortest-path problem
 singly linked list
 singularity analysis
 sink
 sinking sort
 skd-tree
 skew-symmetry
 skip list
 skip search
 slope selection
 Smith algorithm
 Smith–Waterman algorithm
 smoothsort
 solvable problem
 sort algorithm
 sorted array
 sorted list
 sort in-place
 sort merge
 soundex
 space-constructible function
 spanning tree
 sparse graph
 sparse matrix
 sparsification
 sparsity
 spatial access method
 spectral test
 splay tree
 SPMD
 square matrix
 square root
 SST (shortest spanning tree)
 stable
 stack (data structure)
 stack tree
 star-shaped polygon
 start state
 state
 state machine
 state transition
 static data structure
 static Huffman encoding
 s-t cut
 st-digraph
 Steiner minimum tree
 Steiner point
 Steiner ratio
 Steiner tree
 Steiner vertex
 Steinhaus–Johnson–Trotter algorithm
 Stirling's approximation
 Stirling's formula
 stooge sort
 straight-line drawing
 strand sort
 strictly decreasing
 strictly increasing
 strictly lower triangular matrix
 strictly upper triangular matrix
 string
 string editing problem
 string matching
 string matching on ordered alphabets
 string matching with errors
 string matching with mismatches
 string searching
 strip packing
 strongly connected component
 strongly connected graph
 strongly NP-hard
 subadditive ergodic theorem
 subgraph isomorphism
 sublinear time algorithm
 subsequence
 subset
 substring
 subtree
 succinct data structure
 suffix
 suffix array
 suffix automaton
 suffix tree
 superimposed code
 superset
 supersink
 supersource
 symmetric relation
 symmetrically linked list
 symmetric binary B-tree
 symmetric set difference
 symmetry breaking
 symmetric min max heap

T 
 tail
 tail recursion
 tango tree
 target
 temporal logic
 terminal (see Steiner tree)
 terminal node
 ternary search
 ternary search tree (TST)
 text searching
 theta
 threaded binary tree
 threaded tree
 three-dimensional
 three-way merge sort
 three-way radix quicksort
 time-constructible function
 time/space complexity
 top-down radix sort
 top-down tree automaton
 top-node
 topological order
 topological sort
 topology tree
 total function
 totally decidable language
 totally decidable problem
 totally undecidable problem
 total order
 tour
 tournament
 towers of Hanoi
 tractable problem
 transducer
 transition (see finite-state machine)
 transition function (of a finite-state machine or Turing machine)
 transitive relation
 transitive closure
 transitive reduction
 transpose sequential search
 travelling salesman problem (TSP)
 treap
 tree
 tree automaton
 tree contraction
 tree editing problem
 tree sort
 tree transducer
 tree traversal
 triangle inequality
 triconnected graph
 trie
 trinary function
 tripartition
 Turbo-BM
 Turbo Reverse Factor
 Turing machine
 Turing reduction
 Turing transducer
 twin grid file
 two-dimensional
 two-level grid file
 2–3 tree
 2–3–4 tree
 Two Way algorithm
 two-way linked list
 two-way merge sort

U 
 unary function
 unbounded knapsack problem (UKP)
 uncomputable function
 uncomputable problem
 undecidable language
 undecidable problem
 undirected graph
 uniform circuit complexity
 uniform circuit family
 uniform hashing
 uniform matrix
 union
 union of automata
 universal hashing
 universal state
 universal Turing machine
 universe
 unsolvable problem
 unsorted list
 upper triangular matrix

V 
 van Emde Boas priority queue
 vehicle routing problem
 Veitch diagram
 Venn diagram
 vertex
 vertex coloring
 vertex connectivity
 vertex cover
 vertical visibility map
 virtual hashing
 visibility map
 visible (geometry)
 Viterbi algorithm
 VP-tree
 VRP (vehicle routing problem)

W 
 walk
 weak cluster
 weak-heap
 weak-heap sort
 weight-balanced tree
 weighted, directed graph
 weighted graph
 window
 witness
 work-depth model
 work-efficient
 work-preserving
 worst case
 worst-case cost
 worst-case minimum access
 Wu's line algorithm

X 
 Xiaolin Wu's line algorithm
 xor
 Xor filter

Y 
 Yule–Simon distribution

Z 
 Zeller's congruence
 0-ary function
 0-based indexing
 0/1 knapsack problem
 Zhu–Takaoka string matching algorithm
 Zipfian distribution
 Zipf's law
 Zipper (data structure)
 Zip tree
 ZPP

References 

Algorithms and data structures

Algorithms and data structures
 

zh:数据结构与算法列表